Jayme Cortez (Lisbon, September 8th, 1926 - São Paulo, July 4th, 1987) was a Portuguese-born Brazilian comics artist. He is considered one of the most important artists of Brazilian comics. He was born in Portugal and began his career in the Portuguese magazine O Mosquito. He emigrated to Brazil in 1947, and began working with horror and children's comics. In 1959, he founded the Continental publishing house alongside Miguel Penteado, working with important artists such as Rodolfo Zalla, Eugênio Colonnese, Gedeone Malagola, Júlio Shimamoto , Flávio Colin, among others. In 1985, Cortez was awarded the Prêmio Angelo Agostini for Master of National Comics, an award that aims to honor artists who have dedicated themselves to Brazilian comics for at least 25 years. In 1988, a year after his death, the Prêmio Angelo Agostini created the Jayme Cortez Trophy to award great contributions to Brazilian comics.

References 

Brazilian comics artists
Prêmio Angelo Agostini winners
Portuguese comics artists
Film poster artists
Brazilian art educators